Eric Winters (21 January 1921 – 1968) was a British sculptor. His work was part of the sculpture event in the art competition at the 1948 Summer Olympics.

References

1921 births
1968 deaths
20th-century British sculptors
20th-century British male artists
British male sculptors
Olympic competitors in art competitions
People from London